Zahn Tokiya-ku McClarnon (born October 24, 1966) is an American actor known for his performances in the Western crime drama series Longmire, the second season of Fargo, and the second season of Westworld. In 2022, he played the lead role in the AMC series Dark Winds. He also features in the 2021 FX on Hulu series Reservation Dogs, and the Marvel Cinematic Universe series Hawkeye (2021) and Echo (2023).

Early life
McClarnon was born in Denver, Colorado, the son of a Hunkpapa Lakota mother and a father of Irish ancestry. He grew up near Browning, Montana, where his father worked at Glacier National Park for the National Park Service. He would often visit the Blackfeet Indian Reservation, where his mother grew up, and often stayed with his maternal grandparents on weekends and for longer visits. His mother lived on the Rosebud Indian Reservation in South Dakota. When his father was relocated to Omaha, Nebraska, for work, the family lived in the Joslyn Castle and Dundee neighborhoods. McClarnon has a fraternal twin brother.

McClarnon grew up in Nebraska, South Dakota, North Dakota, Minnesota, Wyoming, Ohio and Montana, and has stated that his childhood was "rough."

In 1986, McClarnon graduated from Omaha Central High School. He credits his drama teacher, Peggy Stommes, as a big influence.

Career
McClarnon got his start in a local production of Jesus Christ Superstar at the Chanticleer Theater in Council Bluffs, Iowa. He connected with John Jackson, a local Omaha casting director who later became known for his work with director Alexander Payne. McClarnon gained some local work and in the early 1990s, he moved to Los Angeles for his career.

In the Into the West (2005) miniseries for TNT, McClarnon played Running Fox. He starred in the 2009 film Not Forgotten and comedy film Repo Chick. In 2013, he was in the horror movie Resolution. He had a recurring role as Bodaway Macawi in Ringer. He also played Mike Parker in the first four episodes of the SundanceTV series The Red Road.

From 2012 to 2017, McClarnon portrayed Mathias, the Chief of Indian Tribal Police of the Cheyenne reservation, in Longmire, originally an A&E and later a Netflix television series.

McClarnon portrayed Hanzee Dent in the second season of the TV series Fargo, where his performance received critical acclaim. He appeared in the TV series Timeless as Native American U.S. Marshal Grant Johnson in the episode "The Murder of Jesse James". McClarnon appeared as Toshaway in AMC Network's The Son, for which he learned the Comanche language.

McClarnon appeared as Akecheta, the leader of the Ghost Nation, in HBO's Westworld. Although usually credited as a recurring character, McClarnon was credited as a main cast member in "Kiksuya", the eighth episode of the second season, which focuses almost exclusively on his character's backstory. His performance in the episode received critical acclaim, with the critic's consensus on the review aggregate website Rotten Tomatoes stating that McClarnon delivered a "heart-wrenching, formidable performance" that elevates the episode to "one of the best of the entire series".

Personal life
McClarnon's first name is in honor of his maternal great-great-uncle, Frank "Frances" B. Zahn, who was an artist and Lakota elder of Standing Rock Indian Reservation. McClarnon's middle name, Tokiya-ku, loosely translates to mean: "first one to come." He was given that name by his mother because he was the first delivered in a set of twins. 

In late 2017, McClarnon fell at his home and suffered a brain injury, requiring hospitalization. The accident caused a brief shutdown of production for Westworld.

Filmography

Film

Television

Video games

References

External links
 
 

1966 births
American male television actors
Hunkpapa people
Living people
Native American actors
21st-century American male actors
American male film actors
American people of Irish descent
Native American male actors
20th-century American male actors
People from Browning, Montana
Omaha Central High School alumni
Male actors from Denver
Male actors from Montana
Native American people from Colorado